Yekaterina Eduardovna Bikert (born 13 May 1980) is a Russian athlete who specializes in the 400 metres hurdles.

Her personal best time is 53.72 seconds, achieved in July 2004 in Tula.

She competed in the 400m hurdles at the 2008 Beijing Olympics where she qualified as the second fastest overall for the second round, with a time of 55.15 seconds.
 
She is 5 ft 10 inches and weighs 150 lbs.

International competitions

References

 
 NBC profile

1980 births
Living people
Russian female hurdlers
Olympic female hurdlers
Olympic athletes of Russia
Athletes (track and field) at the 2004 Summer Olympics
Athletes (track and field) at the 2008 Summer Olympics
World Athletics Championships athletes for Russia
Russian Athletics Championships winners